is a female Japanese manga artist and illustrator. She made her debut in September 2003 in the monthly manga magazine Nakayoshi with her story, Tenshi no Tamago ("Angel's Egg", no relation to the anime movie of the same name). Tokyopop licensed her first serialized manga Gokkun! Pūcho under the title Pixie Pop.  Almost all of her works are published by Kodansha.

Works

Manga

Others

Contribution

  Non Non Biyori Official Anthology (Kadokawa) – Manga 
 Love Lab 8.5 (Hobunsha) – 4-panel comics
 Hidamari Sketch Anthology Comic Vol. 5 (Hobunsha) – Illustrations
 Tales of Hearts Anthology Comic (ASCII Media Works) – Illustrations
 Persona 4 Dengeki Anthology Comic (ASCII Media Works)  – Illustrations and manga

Others
 Main character design for Mobage's Lost Kingdom (developed by R-Force Entertainment)

References

External links
  
 

 
Living people
1981 births
Japanese female comics artists
Female comics writers
Women manga artists
Manga artists from Tokyo
People from Tokyo
Japanese women writers